Tamara Shukakidze Demuria ( born June 11, 1980) of Tbilisi, Georgia served as the Vice-Chairman of the Eurasia Regional Scout Committee of the World Organization of the Scout Movement (WOSM). Tamara serves as a Chief Humanitarian Officer with Corus International, based in Washington D.C. Among multiple roles throughout her career, she also worked as associate Director, Crisis Response and Integrated Development at FHI360, a Director of Practice, Partnerships and Innovation, Deputy Director of Strategy of the Emergency and Humanitarian Assistance Team of CARE USA based in Washington, D.C. She holds a Master of Arts degree from York St. John University and a Bachelor of Arts in Public Administration from Georgian Technical University.

See also

References

External links

https://www.linkedin.com/in/tamara-shukakidze-84613814

Scouting in Georgia (country)
Living people
1980 births
Eurasia Scout Committee members